for other people called Sabinus, see Sabinus (disambiguation)

Saint Sabinus of Canosa (461 – 9 February 566), venerated as a saint in the Roman Catholic church, was bishop of Canosa di Puglia from 514.

Life
He was sent twice as a papal envoy to Constantinople, in 525, by Pope John I and in 536 to accompany Pope Agapitus I, who lost his life on the journey, to defend the true faith against the Monophysite heresy. He attended the Council of Constantinople (536).

In 531, in the papacy of Pope Boniface II, he took part in the Synod of Rome. He was a builder of churches and other religious buildings, according to the Benedictine discipline of Ora et labora ("Work and pray").

He died after 52 years as bishop, on 9 February 566.

Cult
Sabinus was a friend of Saint Benedict, whom he visited at Montecassino and to whom, as recorded by Gregory the Great, he once expressed his preoccupations on the incursions of the Ostrogoth King Totila into the Italian peninsula. According to the hagiographic legend, he succeeded in saving Canosa di Puglia from the threat of the latter. There is a story that in 548 Totila wanted to test the prophetic gifts of Sabinus, who was by then old and blind. The king, pretending to be a servant, offered him a goblet of wine, but Sabinus was not deceived and thanked him by name, which impressed Totila so much that he renounced his pillaging.

Another legend of Sabinus relates that a jealous archdeacon tried to poison him. Sabinus drank the poison but did not die; but the archdeacon did. For this reason he appeared in the liturgy as a protector against poisons.

His relics were translated to the present Canosa Cathedral on 1 August in an unknown year of the 8th century by bishop Pietro. After the destruction of the town by the Saracens, the relics were rescued from the ruins by Saint Angelarius in 844 and taken to Bari Cathedral.

Saint Sabinus is venerated in Canosa and Bari, in both of which places the cathedrals are dedicated to him, in Torremaggiore and Furci.

The only church in the United Kingdom dedicated to him is the Church of St Sabinus in Woolacombe in Devon.

Feast days
Canosa di Puglia, 9 February: death of Saint Sabinus
Torremaggiore, the first Saturday, Sunday, Monday and Tuesday in June: Festa Patronale
Canosa di Puglia, 31 July to 2 August: Festa Patronale

References
Gerardo A. Chiancone - La Cattedrale e il Mausoleo di Boemondo a Canosa (tip. D. Guglielmi, Andria, 1983; pag. 54)
Attilio Paulicelli - San Sabino nella storia di Canosa (tip. San Paolo, Bari, 1967)
La tradizione barese di s. Sabino di Canosa. A cura di Salvatore Palese. Bari, Edipuglia, 2001. Contiene i seguenti studi:
Ada Campione, Sabino di Canosa tra storia e leggenda, p. 23-46
Pasquale Corsi, Canosa e Bari nelle modificazioni ecclesiastiche dei Bizantini, p. 47-56
Gioia Bertelli, Le reliquie di s. Sabino da Canosa a Bari: tra tradizione e archeologia, p. 57-78
Gerardo Cioffari o. p., Le origini del culto di s. Sabino a Bari, p. 79-98
Nicola Bux, La liturgia barese di s. Sabino, p. 99-106
Anna Maria Tripputi, La devozione barese a s. Sabino in età moderna e contemporanea, p. 107-114
Francesco Quarto - Un isolato omaggio tra devozione ed erudizione. La vita di S. Sabino del canonico Giuseppe Di Cagno, p. 115-170.
La Historia di S. Sabino di Antonio Beatillo (1629). A cura di Francesco Quarto. In Nicolaus Studi Storici, XVII, 2006, p. 97-160.

External links
Santi E Beati: San Sabino di Canosa 

Italian saints
Bishops in Apulia
People from Canosa di Puglia
461 births
566 deaths